Susquehanna Township High School (STHS) is a mid-sized, public high school located in Harrisburg, Pennsylvania serving students from Susquehanna Township. The school provides grades 9 through 12. In the 2017–18 school year, the school had 788 pupils.

Extracurriculars
Susquehanna Township School District offers a wide variety of clubs, activities and an extensive competitive sports program.

Sports
The district funds:

Boys
Baseball - AAA
Basketball- AAA
Cross Country - Class AA
Football - AAA
Golf - AAA
Indoor Track and Field - AAAA
Soccer - AA
Swimming and Diving - Class AA
Tennis - AA
Track and Field - AAA
Wrestling - AAA

Girls
Basketball - AAA
Cheer - AAAA (2015)
Cross Country - AA
Field Hockey - AA
Golf - AAA
Indoor Track and Field - AAAA
Soccer (Fall) - AA
Softball - AAA
Swimming and Diving - Class AA
Tennis - AA
Track and FIeld - AAA

According to PIAA directory July 2015

Notable alumni
Marques Colston, former wide receiver for the New Orleans Saints of the NFL
Timothy DeFoor, Pennsylvania Auditor General
Jeffrey Piccola, Pennsylvania State Representative and State Senator
ImeIme Umana, the first African-American woman elected president of the Harvard Law Review

References

External links
 Susquehanna Township High School

Education in Harrisburg, Pennsylvania
High schools in Central Pennsylvania
Susquehanna Valley
Schools in Dauphin County, Pennsylvania
Public high schools in Pennsylvania